The Lady Keystone Open was a golf tournament on the LPGA Tour from 1975 to 1994. In its first year it was a satellite tour event but became a full event in 1976. It was played at three different courses in southcentral Pennsylvania but mainly at the Hershey Country Club in Hershey, Pennsylvania.

Tournament hosts

Winners
1994 Elaine Crosby
1993 Val Skinner
1992 Danielle Ammaccapane
1991 Colleen Walker
1990 Cathy Gerring
1989 Laura Davies
1988 Shirley Furlong
1987 Ayako Okamoto
1986 Juli Inkster
1985 Juli Inkster
1984 Amy Alcott
1983 Jan Stephenson
1982 Jan Stephenson
1981 JoAnne Carner
1980 JoAnne Carner
1979 Nancy Lopez
1978 Pat Bradley
1977 Sandra Spuzich
1976 Susie Berning
1975 Susie Berning (as satellite event)

References

External links
Tournament results at golfobserver.com

Former LPGA Tour events
Golf in Pennsylvania
Recurring sporting events established in 1975
Recurring events disestablished in 1994
1975 establishments in Pennsylvania
1994 disestablishments in Pennsylvania
History of women in Pennsylvania